The men's 4 x 400 metres relay at the 1950 European Athletics Championships was held in Brussels, Belgium, at Heysel Stadium on 26 and 27 August 1950.

Medalists

Results

Final
27 August

Heats
26 August

Heat 1

Heat 2

Participation
According to an unofficial count, 36 athletes from 9 countries participated in the event.  The fourth member of both the Belgian and Dutch relay teams are unknown.

 (4)
 (4)
 (4)
 (4)
 (4)
 (4)
 (4)
 (4)
 (4)

References

4 x 400 metres relay
4 x 400 metres relay at the European Athletics Championships